German submarine U-2327 was a Type XXIII U-boat of Nazi Germany's Kriegsmarine during World War II. She was ordered on 20 September 1943, and was laid down on 16 May 1944 at Deutsche Werft, Hamburg, as yard number 481. She was launched on 29 July 1944 and commissioned under the command of Oberleutnant zur See Heinrich Mürl on 19 August 1944.

Design
Like all Type XXIII U-boats, U-2327 had a displacement of  when at the surface and  while submerged. The submarine was powered by one MWM six-cylinder RS134S diesel engine providing , one AEG GU4463-8 double-acting electric motor electric motor providing , and one BBC silent running CCR188 electric motor providing .

U-2327 was fitted with two  torpedo tubes in the bow. She could carry two preloaded torpedoes. The complement was 14–18 men. This class of U-boat did not carry a deck gun.

Service history
On 2 May 1945, U-2327 was scuttled at Kiel as part of Operation Regenbogen. The wreck was later raised and broken up.

See also
 Battle of the Atlantic

References

Bibliography

External links

U-boats commissioned in 1944
World War II submarines of Germany
1944 ships
Type XXIII submarines
Ships built in Hamburg
Operation Regenbogen (U-boat)
Maritime incidents in May 1945